Roelof Josephus "Roel" de Wit  (31 March 1927 in Amsterdam – 3 June 2012 in Haarlem) was a Dutch politician of the Labour Party (PvdA) and a conservationist.

De Wit studied biology at the University of Amsterdam. He became a member of the Provincial States of North Holland in 1958 and a member of the municipal council of Amsterdam in 1962. From 1965 to 1970 he was an alderman of Amsterdam.

He served as Mayor of Alkmaar from 1970 until 1976 and as Queen's Commissioner of North Holland from 1976 until 1992. He retired in 1992.

De Wit died at the age of 85 in his hometown of Haarlem in 2012.

References
 Parlement.com 

1927 births
2012 deaths
Aldermen of Amsterdam
Municipal councillors of Amsterdam
Dutch biologists
Dutch conservationists
King's and Queen's Commissioners of North Holland
Labour Party (Netherlands) politicians
Mayors of Alkmaar
Members of the Provincial Council of North Holland
University of Amsterdam alumni